Van Buren School District (VBSD) is located in Van Buren, Arkansas.  As of the 2005–6 school year, there were 5,932 students enrolled and employed over 600 regular employees and over 100 substitute employees.

History

Merle Dickerson served as the superintendent until her June 2014 resignation; Kerry Schneider therefore became interim superintendent.

Schools

As of 2015, VBSD had six elementary schools (K-5), two middle schools (6-8), one junior high schools (9) and one high school (10-12).

High schools
 Van Buren High School

Junior High/Middle Schools
 Northridge Middle School
 Butterfield Middle School
 Freshman Academy

Elementary schools
 Rena Elementary School
 King Elementary School
 Izard Elementary School
 Parkview Elementary School
 James R. Tate Elementary School
 Oliver Springs Elementary School
 Central Elementary School

Statistics

Its Average Daily Attendance (ADA) was 5,162.25 students which had increased by 3.1% over the previous 5 years. It transported an average of 3,706.37 students via the bus system. It was assessed at $260,015,517 with a district debt of $19,189,387 and a borrowing power of 51,014,803.

Human Resources

The Van Buren School District is one of the largest employers in the city of Van Buren employing over 600 regular employees and over 100 substitute employees.

 There are 443 certified/licensed employees. These include teachers and other support professionals such as guidance counselors, school nurses, media specialists, etc.
 The 201 support staff employees are employees of instructional support services, auxiliary services support and administrative support.
 There are also 16 principals and assistant principals and five central office administrators.

Sources
Annual Statistical Report 2002-2003
Certified Salary Schedule 2006-2007
VBSD District Information

References

External links
Van Buren School District Website

School districts in Arkansas
Education in Crawford County, Arkansas
Van Buren, Arkansas